Chengbei Subdistrict is a subdistrict of Wuling District, Changde, Hunan, People's Republic of China. , it has four residential communities and three villages under its administration.

References

Subdistricts of Hunan
Wuling District